Bacea may refer to several villages in Romania:

 Bacea, a village in Ilia Commune, Hunedoara County
 Bacea, a village in Movileni Commune, Olt County